In mathematics, the Feferman–Schütte ordinal Γ0 is a large countable ordinal.
It is the proof-theoretic ordinal of several mathematical theories, such as arithmetical transfinite recursion.
It is named after Solomon Feferman and Kurt Schütte, the former of whom suggested the name Γ0.

There is no standard notation for ordinals beyond the Feferman–Schütte ordinal.

Definition
The Feferman–Schütte ordinal can be defined as the smallest ordinal that cannot be obtained by starting with 0 and using the operations of ordinal addition and the Veblen functions φα(β). That is, it is the smallest α such that φα(0) = α.

Properties

This ordinal is sometimes said to be the first impredicative ordinal, though this is controversial, partly because there is no generally accepted precise definition of "predicative". Sometimes an ordinal is said to be predicative if it is less than Γ0.

Any recursive path ordering whose function symbols are well-founded with order type less than that of  itself has order type .

References

Proof theory
Ordinal numbers